Mundlamuru is a village in Prakasam district of the Indian state of Andhra Pradesh. It is the mandal headquarters of Mundlamuru mandal in Kandukur revenue division. Under Darsi constituency and Ongole parliament

References 

Villages in Prakasam district